Zanda is a Latvian feminine given name. The associated name day is October 1.

Notable people named Zanda
Zanda Bikše (born 1970), Latvian curler
Zanda Kalniņa-Lukaševica (born 1978), Latvian politician
Zanda Zakuza, South African artists

References 

Latvian feminine given names
Feminine given names